Soyuz TMA-5 was a Soyuz mission to the International Space Station (ISS)  launched by a Soyuz-FG launch vehicle.

Crew

TMA 5 ISS 10 Crew patches were designed by Seán O'Mara for USSR Airspace.

Docking with ISS
Docked to ISS: October 16, 2004, 04:16 UTC (to Pirs module)
Undocked from ISS: November 29, 2004, 09:29 UTC (from Pirs module)
Docked to ISS: November 29, 2004, 09:53 UTC (to nadir port of Zarya)
Undocked from ISS: April 24, 2005, 18:44 UTC (from nadir port of Zarya)

Mission highlights

25th crewed flight to ISS.

Soyuz TMA-5 is a Soyuz spacecraft that was launched on October 14, 2004 by a Soyuz-FG rocket from Baikonur Cosmodrome.

The Expedition 10 crew, Leroy Chiao of the US and Salizhan Sharipov of Russia replaced the Expedition 9 crew, Gennady Padalka - Cdr. Russia and Edward Fincke U.S.A.

The launch of Expedition 10 was delayed beyond its scheduled October 9, 2004 launch date. During preflight testing, an explosive bolt was accidentally activated on the Soyuz TMA-5 spacecraft. The resulting damage was repaired prior to launch.

The docking maneuver had to be done manually, as the approach by the automatic system was too fast.

The undocking was done manually as well, as a cautionary measure to save power on a faulty battery.

After 193 days in the station the Expedition 10 crew returned to a soft landing in Kazakhstan together with Italian Roberto Vittori who had flown up with the Expedition 11 crew on Soyuz TMA-6.

References

Crewed Soyuz missions
Spacecraft launched in 2004
Spacecraft which reentered in 2005
Spacecraft launched by Soyuz-FG rockets